Isinga (Iisenge) is a rural locality (a selo) and the administrative centre of Isinginskoye Rural Settlement, Yeravninsky District, Republic of Buryatia, Russia. The population was 911 as of 2017. There are 21 streets.

Geography 
Isinga is located by Lake Isinga, 55 km northeast of Sosnovo-Ozerskoye (the district's administrative centre) by road. Khorga is the nearest rural locality.

References 

Rural localities in Yeravninsky District